Courting the Squall is the debut solo album by the English musician Guy Garvey, who is best known as the lead singer of Elbow. It was released on 30 October 2015 in the UK through Polydor.

Reception
Writing in Mojo, James McNair said:
'Courting the Squall' finds Garvey and 'his favourite players outside elbow' on superlative, genre-hopping form. The minimalist marvel of in-the-pocket groove that is 'Unwind' blossoms thanks to Pete Jobson of I Am Kloot's divine guitar motif. Harder Edges and Belly Of The Whale mine a kind of wiry, colliery funk and Electricity, a perfectly weighted duet with Jolie Holland, soothes and transports like some between the wars jazz standard. Better yet, Garvey's poetics have acquired still more acuity, and never more so than on the sublime Marxaphone and Pixaphone infused reverie 'Juggernaut'.

The Independent said:
At the album’s heart, however, are the sketched impressions of quiet emotional turmoil that have become part of Garvey’s stock-in-trade, a personal space bookended here by the ebullient energy so charmingly contained by the plaintive melodica, cycling piano and dulcimer of 'Juggernaut' and the gloom that finds him "missing that moody girl" in 'Harder Edges'. "I’m sick of ticking boredom, counting down the beating hours,” he notes; “She was capable of kind, but not inclined" – a couplet that carries a whole world of regret.

Helen Brown of The Daily Telegraph said:
The result is more urgent, less reassuringly structured than your typical Elbow record. Gone are the cross currents of texture, soaring melodies and matey glow. But it's exciting to hear Garvey out on a limb, his windblown voice often striking out alone across the bare wire 
of a basic groove.

Rob Mesure of musicOMH concluded the album was "as down-to-earth and likeable as its creator" and said it was "an enjoyable collection that mostly avoids the pitfalls of solo albums by members of successful bands that are still very much a going concern."

Track listing 
The track listing of the album was confirmed on iTunes.

Personnel

Musicians
Brass arrangements – Guy Garvey
Bass – Nathan Sudders
Drums, percussion – Alex Reeves
Guitar – Pete Jobson
Harp – Rachael Gladwin
Vibes – Heron
Piano, synthesizer – Ben Christophers
Saxophone – Anna Kirby
Trumpet – Victoria Rule
Trumpet, saxophone – Sarah Field
Vocals – Guy Garvey, Jolie Holland

Production
Score – Chris Worsey
Recording Assistants – Oli Jacobs, Patrick Philips, Tim Thomas
Producers – Danny Evans, Guy Garvey
Engineering, mixing – Danny Evans
Mastering – Tim Young
Management – Phil Chadwick, Sharon Chadwick, TRC
Photography – Deirdre O'Callaghan
Design – Paul West

Charts

References

2015 debut albums
Polydor Records albums